Frank Edward McKinney Jr. (November 3, 1938 – September 11, 1992) was an American competition swimmer, Olympic champion, and former world record-holder.  He later became a prominent executive in the American banking industry, but died in a mid-air collision of two aircraft.

McKinney was the son of Frank E. McKinney, a former chairman of the Democratic National Committee and a former owner of the National League's Pittsburgh Pirates of Major League Baseball.  

He was the youngest member of a U.S. national swim team which set a world record in the 4×100-meter medley relay at the 1955 Pan American Games.  At the Pan American Games, the 16-year-old high school student also won a gold medal in the 100-meter backstroke.
	 
Born in Indianapolis, Indiana, he did the most to introduce modern backstroke techniques. Following Yoshi Oyakawa as the premier U.S. backstroker, McKinney was the pioneer of the modern bent-arm backstrokers, even as Oyakawa had been the last of the straight-arm school.  McKinney was the leader of a remarkable group of teenagers who won the U.S. Nationals for the Indianapolis Athletic Club alongside Mike Troy, Bill Barton, Bill Cass and Alan Somers.  Later, they would all swim for the Indiana Hoosiers swimming and diving team under coach Doc Counsilman at Indiana University.
	 
McKinney captured a bronze medal in the men's 100-meter backstroke at the 1956 Summer Olympics in Melbourne, Australia, then afterward entered Indiana University.

At the 1960 Summer Olympics in Rome, Italy, he received a silver medal for his second-place finish in the men's 100-meter backstroke. He also won a gold medal by swimming the lead-off backstroke leg for the first-place U.S. team in the men's 4×100-meter medley relay.

McKinney retired from competition after graduating from Indiana University in 1961, and went into banking. He was the president of Bank One of Indiana (previously American Fletcher National Bank), headquartered in Indianapolis when he died, aged 53, in a mid-air collision between two aircraft in 1992.  As part of the merger, he also became president of the Columbus, Ohio-based parent company, Banc One Corporation, while still serving as the chief executive officer of the Indiana subsidiary. McKinney was traveling to Columbus, Ohio, with 3 other civic leaders, who were also killed along with the pilots of both aircraft.
 He is buried in Crown Hill Cemetery in Indianapolis.

See also
 List of members of the International Swimming Hall of Fame
 List of Indiana University (Bloomington) people
 List of Olympic medalists in swimming (men)
 World record progression 200 metres backstroke
 World record progression 4 × 100 metres medley relay

References

External links
 
  Frank McKinney (USA) – Honor Swimmer profile at International Swimming Hall of Fame

1938 births
1992 deaths
American bankers
American male backstroke swimmers
World record setters in swimming
Indiana Hoosiers men's swimmers
Olympic bronze medalists for the United States in swimming
Olympic gold medalists for the United States in swimming
Olympic silver medalists for the United States in swimming
Swimmers from Indianapolis
Swimmers at the 1955 Pan American Games
Swimmers at the 1956 Summer Olympics
Swimmers at the 1959 Pan American Games
Swimmers at the 1960 Summer Olympics
Victims of aviation accidents or incidents in the United States
20th-century American businesspeople
Medalists at the 1960 Summer Olympics
Medalists at the 1956 Summer Olympics
Pan American Games gold medalists for the United States
Pan American Games medalists in swimming
Medalists at the 1955 Pan American Games
Medalists at the 1959 Pan American Games
20th-century American people